Himid Mao Mkami (born 5 November 1992) is a Tanzanian footballer who currently plays as a midfielder for ENPPI SC.

Early life
Himid Mao was born in Dar es Salaam, Tanzania to Mao Mkami and Asia. Mao is the first born among his siblings and has four younger brothers Femina, Rozmana, Faisal and Rahim. His father, also a footballer was popularly known by his nickname "Ball Dancer" and was capped at national level during 1991–1995. His primary education started at Kiwandani Primary School, Turiani, Morogoro, after which he later moved to Dar es Salaam Karume and studied their till sixth grade. He completed his primary education at Omar Ali Juma Primary School, Magomeni, Dar es Salaam and later joined Tabata Secondary School where he completed his Form 4 in 2011.

Club career
Mao started with Elite Academy in 2005, and after getting a Tanzania U-17 callup, he was soon added to Azam Academy in 2007, where he won the youth cup (Uhai Cup) twice in a row. In 2008, he played his first professional match against Kagera Sugar, and was promoted to the senior side by 2009. During the 2013–14 season, he scored a goal against Ruvu Shooting, and helped Azam to win the Tanzanian Premier League for the first time in their history. He also helped them finish five times as runners-up in the league (in 2011–12, 2012–13, 2014–15, 2016–17 and 2017–18).

After a successful 11 years at Azam, he joined Egyptian side Petrojet in June 2018. At his first season at the club, he played in 30 out of 34 league matches, but had his club relegated at the end of the season after accumulating 35 points in 34 games, 2 points shy of the 15th placed team El Gouna. This was Petrojet's first ever relegation from the Egyptian Premier League, since they were promoted for the first time in the 2006–07 season. On 1 August 2019, Mao joined ENPPI SC on a 2 year contract.

International career
Mao was called up for the Tanzanian U-17 squad participating in 2010 Under-17 Copa Coca-Cola in South Africa, by coach Marcos Tinoco. Tanzania scored 32 goals in the group stage, while conceded only 3 to qualify for the next round. They were eventually knocked out in the quarter-finals, when they were defeated 1–0 by Botswana. He quickly rose in ranks and soon played for the U-20's and the U-23's under coach Márcio Máximo.

On 15 July 2017, he scored his first ever international goal in a 1–1 draw against Rwanda in the 2018 African Nations Championship qualification. Tanzania were not able to advance to the next round after losing to Rwanda on away goals.

On 13 June 2019, Mao was named in Tanzania's 23-man squad for the 2019 Africa Cup of Nations in Egypt.

Career statistics

Club

Notes

International

International goals
Scores and results list Tanzania's goal tally first.

Honours

Club

Azam
Tanzanian Premier League (1): 2013–14

References

1992 births
Living people
Tanzanian footballers
Tanzanian expatriate footballers
Tanzania international footballers
Association football midfielders
Egyptian Premier League players
Azam F.C. players
Petrojet SC players
ENPPI SC players
Expatriate footballers in Egypt
Tanzanian expatriate sportspeople in Egypt
People from Dar es Salaam
2019 Africa Cup of Nations players